Pennsylvania Municipal Retirement System (also known as PMERS) is an independent state agency of the Commonwealth of Pennsylvania that manages the public pension system for some municipal employees in Pennsylvania.  It was founded in 1974.

See also
 List of Pennsylvania state agencies

References

Local government in Pennsylvania
Government of Pennsylvania
Public pension funds in the United States